FPCT could mean:

 familial porphyria cutanea tarda, a medical term for an enzyme disorder
 Fells Point Corner Theatre, a community theatre in Baltimore, Maryland
 Fielding percentage, a baseball term
 Flat panel computed tomography, a medical technology term